Lily Nicksay (born January 8, 1988) is an American actress. She is known for originating the role of Morgan Matthews, Cory's little sister, in the first two seasons of Boy Meets World. She reprised the role for the season 3 finale of Girl Meets World.

Career
Nicksay's television credits include guest star appearances on NCIS, The Mentalist, The Guardian, 8 Simple Rules, and Judging Amy. She has also appeared in the feature films The Negotiator, The Adventures of Rocky and Bullwinkle, and Up Close & Personal, and in the 1995 television movie The Christmas Box.

She was seen in a series of UPS commercials, featuring as an operations manager in a company called Gunderman Group.

Nicksay starred as May in the 2017 production of Gulf View Drive, the 2016 production of See Rock City, and the 2015 production of Last Train To Nibroc at the Rubicon Theatre, to rave reviews. (The three plays, all written by Arlene Hutton, are known as The Nibroc Trilogy.) She won the 2017 LA Stage Alliance Ovation Award for Best Lead Actress in a Play for her performance in See Rock City. Gulf View Drive won the 2018 Ovation Award for Best Production (Large Theatre), and Nicksay was nominated for Best Lead Actress in a Play.

Personal life
Nicksay graduated from the University of St Andrews, Scotland, with an MA degree in Latin and Ancient Greek. She married BMG songwriter Dave Gibson on August 16, 2015.

Filmography

Film

Television

Theatre credits

Awards and nominations

References

External links

 
Official website

1988 births
American child actresses
American television actresses
Living people
Place of birth missing (living people)
Alumni of the University of St Andrews
20th-century American actresses
21st-century American actresses